Movies about horses constitute a popular film genre. Some examples include:

0–9
 8 Seconds (1994)
 50 to 1 (2014)

A

 Above the Limit (1900)
 Aces of the Turf (1932)
 A Champion Heart (2018)
 A Day at the Races (1937)
 A Dead Certainty (1920)
 Adventures of Gallant Bess (1948)
 The Adventures of Rex and Rinty (1935)
 A Fine Step (2011)
 A Great Coup (1919)
 A Horse Called Bear (2015)
 A Horse Called Wish (2019)
 A Horse for Danny (1995)
 Albion: The Enchanted Stallion (2016)
 All In (1936)
 All Roads Lead Home (2008)
 All the Pretty Horses (2000)
 Amanda (1996)
 An American Girl: Saige Paints the Sky (2013)
 The Appaloosa (1966)
 Apple Of My Eye (2017)
 April Love (1957)
 Ariadne in Hoppegarten (1928)
 A Sporting Double (1922)
 A Sunday Horse (2016)
 A Turf Conspiracy (1918)

B

Barbie & Her Sisters in A Pony Tale (2013)
Barnet Horse Fair (1896)
Beautiful Kitty (1923)
Big Boy (1930)
Bite the Bullet (1975)
Black Beauty (1921)
Black Beauty (1946)
Black Beauty (1971)
Black Beauty (1978)
Black Beauty (1994)
Black Beauty (2020)
The Black Stallion (1979)
The Black Stallion Returns (1983)
Blue Fire Lady (1977)
Blue Grass of Kentucky (1950)
Boots Malone (1952)
Boy Woodburn (1922)
Brady's Escape (1983)
Breezing Home (1937)
The Bride Wore Boots (1946)
Broadway Bill (1934)
Buck (2011)

C
 Camp Harlow (2014)
 The Calendar (1931)
 Carbine's Heritage (1927)
 Casey's Shadow (1978)
 Cavalry (1936)
 Champions (1984)
 Charlie Chan at the Race Track (1936)
 The Colt (2005)
 Come On George! (1939)
 Corral (1954)
 The County Fair (1932)
 County Fair (1937)
 County Fair (1950)
 Cowgirls 'n Angels (2012)
 Cowgirls 'n Angels: Dakota's Summer (2014)
 A Cowgirl's Story (2017)
 Crazy Over Horses (1951)
 The Cup (2011)
 Courage of Black Beauty (1957)
 Coyote Summer (1996)

D
 Danielle Steel's Palomino (1991)
 Danse avec lui (2007)
 Dark Horse (1992)
 Dark Horse (2014)
 Das Mädchen Marion (1956)
 Dead Heat (2002)
 The Derby (1895)
 Derby (1926)
 Derby (1949)
 Derby Day (1952)
 The Derby Stallion (2005)
 Der eiserne Gustav (1958)
 Devil on Horseback (1954)
 The Double Event (1921)
 Down the Stretch (1936)
 The Draft Horse (1942)
 Dreamer: Inspired by a True Story (2005)
 Drei Mann auf einem Pferd (1957)

E
 Educated Evans (1936)
 The Electric Horseman (1979)
 Emma's Chance (2016)
 En équilibre (2015)
 Ennodu Vilayadu (2017)
 Equus (1977)
 Escape from the Dark (1976)
 The Ex-Mrs. Bradford (1936)
 Eyes of Fate (1933)

F

 Fast Companions (1932)
 Febbre da cavallo (1976)
 Felicity: An American Girl Adventure (2005)
 The Fighting Stallion (1950)
 The Flash (1997)
 Flicka (2006)
 Flicka 2 (2010)
 Flicka: Country Pride (2012)
 Florian (1940)
 The Flying Fifty-Five (1924)
 Flying Fifty-Five (1939)
 Francis Goes to the Races (1951)

G
 Gallant Bess (1946)
 Gallopin' Gals (1940)
 The Galloping Major (1951)
 A Gamble for Love (1917)
 Garryowen (1920)
 Glory (1956)
 Going Places (1938)
 The Great Dan Patch (1949)
 The Great Mike (1944)
 The Greening of Whitney Brown (2011)
 Gypsy Colt (1954)

H

 Heart of Virginia (1948)
 Heartland (2007)
 He Married His Wife (1940)
 Hidalgo (2004)
 Home on the Range (2004)
 The Horse Boy (2009)
 Hochzeitsnacht im Regen (1967)
 Home in Indiana (1944)
 Hoofs and Goofs (1957)
 Horse Camp (2013)
 The Horse Dancer (2017)
 The Horse in the Gray Flannel Suit (1968)
 The Horsemasters (1961)
 The Horsemen (1971)
 The Horse Whisperer (1998)
 The Horse with the Flying Tail (1960)
 Horsing Around (1957)
 Hot Tip (1935)
 The Hottentot (1922)
 The Hottentot (1929)
 Hot to Trot (1988)

I
 In Old Kentucky (1935)
 In Pursuit of Honor (2008)
 International Velvet  (1978)
 Into the Straight (1949)
 Into the West (2003)
 It Ain't Hay (1943)

J
 Jappeloup (2013)
 Jiggs and Maggie in Jackpot Jitters (1949)
 Johnny Steals Europe (1932)
 Justin Morgan Had a Horse (1972)

K

 Keep 'Em Rolling (1934)
 Kentucky (1938)
 Kentucky Blue Streak (1935)
 Kentucky Pride (1925)
 King of the Wind (1990)
 Kissing Cup (1913)

L

 The Lady Owner (1923)
 The Last War Horse  (1986)
 The Law of the Wild (1934)
 The Lemon Drop Kid (1951) 
 Lean on Pete (2017) 
 Let It Ride (1989)
 Little Miss Marker (1934)
 Little Miss Marker (1980)
 The Littlest Outlaw (1955)
 Long Odds (1922)
 Long Shot (1939)
 The Longshot (1986)
 The Long Shot (2004)
 Lost Stallions: The Journey Home (2008)
 Luck of the Turf (1936)
 Lucky Blaze (1933)
 The Littlest Horse Thieves (1976)

M
 Ma and Pa Kettle at the Fair (1952)
 The Man From Snowy River (1982)
 The Man from Snowy River II (1988)
 The Man in the Saddle (1925)
 The Man in the Saddle (1945)
 The March Hare (1956)
 Maryland (1940)
 Mazeppa (1993)
 Men of Chance (1932)
 Miracle of the White Stallions (1963)
 Midnight Stallion (2013)
 The Misfits (1961)
 The Missouri Traveler (1958)
 Misty (1961)
 Money from Home (1953)
 Moondance Alexander (2007)
 Mr. Celebrity (1941)
 Mustang! (1959)
 Mustang Country (1976)
 The Mustang (2019)
 My Brother Talks to Horses (1947)
 My Friend Flicka (1943)
 My Little Pony: A Very Minty Christmas (2005)
 My Little Pony: A Very Pony Place (2007)
 My Little Pony: The Movie (1986)
 My Little Pony: The Movie (2017)
 My Little Pony: The Princess Promenade (2006)
 My Little Pony: Twinkle Wish Adventure (2009)
 My Old Man (1979)
 My Pal Trigger (1946)

N

 Natalie Rose (1998)
 National Velvet (1944)
 Nico the Unicorn (1998)
 Northwest Stampede (1948)

O
 Of Horses and Men (2013)

P
 P.C. Josser (1931)
 Palio (1932)
 Pallard the Punter (1919)
 Phantom Stallion (1954)
 Phar Lap (1983)
 Phar Lap's Son (1936)
 Playing the Ponies (1937)
 Pride of the Blue Grass (1939)
 Pride of the Blue Grass (1954)
 Princess and the Pony (2011)

R
 Race to Redemption (2016)
 Racetrack (1933)
 Racing Lady (1937)
 Racing Stripes (2005)
 The Rainbow Jacket (1954)
 Ready to Run (2000)
 A Reckless Gamble (1928)
 Red Canyon (1949)
 The Red Horses (1950)
 The Red Pony (1949)
 The Red Pony (1973)
 The Red Stallion (1947)
 Red Stallion in the Rockies (1949)
 The Reivers (1969)
 The Return of October (1948)
 Ride a Wild Pony (1975)
 Riding for Germany (1941)
 Riding High (1950)
 Rodeo Girl (2016)
 The Rogue Stallion (1990)
 Rogues of the Turf (1923)
 The Rounders (1965)
 Ruffian (2007)
 Run for the Roses (1977)
 Running Free (1999)
 Running Wild (2017)
 Run Wild, Run Free (1969)

S
 The Sad Horse (1959)
 Sand (1949)
 Saratoga (1937)
 The Scarlet Lady (1922)
 Seabiscuit (2003)
 Second Chances  (1998)
 Secretariat (2010)
 The Secret of Cavelli (1934)
 Shadow of the Thin Man (1941)
 Shannon's Rainbow (2011)
 She Monkeys (2011)
 Shergar (1999)
 She Went to the Races (1945)
 The Silver Brumby (1993)
 The Sixth Race (1953)
 Smoky (1946)
 Snowfire (1958)
 Something to Talk About (1995)
 Son of Kissing Cup (1922)
 Sorrowful Jones (1949)
 Spirit Untamed (2021)
 Spirit: Stallion of the Cimarron (2002)
 Spirits of the Dead (1968)
 Sporting Blood (1931)
 Sporting Blood (1940)
 The Sporting Lover (1926)
 The Sport of Kings (1921)
 Stable Companions (1922)
 Stakes (2015)
 The Steed (2019)
 The Stirrup Cup Sensation (1924)
 Storm Rider (2013)
 The Story of Seabiscuit (1949)
 The Strawberry Roan (1948)
 Stretch (2011)
 The Sunset Derby (1927)
 Sylvester (1985)

T

 Take a Chance (1937)
 Thank Evans (1938)
 The Thoroughbred (1928)
 The Palomino (1950)
 Thoroughbred (1936)
 Thoroughbreds Don't Cry (1937)
 This Way of Life (2009)
 Three Men on a Horse (1936)
 Thunderhead, Son of Flicka (1945)
 Tonka (1958)
 The Long Shot (2004)
 The Turin Horse (2011)
 Trainer and Temptress (1925)
 Tumbleweed (1953)
 Two Bits and Pepper (1995)
 Two Thoroughbreds (1939)

U
 Under My Skin (1950)
 Under the Pampas Moon (1935)
 Under Western Skies (1945)
 Up for the Derby (1933)

V
 The Victor (1932)
 The Violet of Potsdamer Platz (1936)
 Virginia's Run (2002)

W

 War Horse (2011)
 Weavers of Fortune (1922)
 Wedding in Barenhof (1942)
 What Price Loving Cup? (1923)
 Where Is Winky's Horse? (2007)
 The Whip (1928)
 Whisper: Libres comme le vent (2013)
 White Mane (1953)
 The White Outlaw (1925)
 The White Pony (1999)
 Wildfire (1915)
 Wildfire (1945)
 Wild Hearts Can't Be Broken (1993)
 Wild Horse (1931)
 The Wild Horse Redemption (2007)
 The Wild Stallion (2009)
 Wine, Women and Horses (1937)
 The Winged Horse (1932)
 Winky's Horse (2005)
 The Winter Stallion (1992)
 Winter's Tale (2014)
 Won by a Head (1920)
 Wildfire (1986 animated)
 The Wild Pony (1983)
 Wild Horses (1985 television movie)

Y
 You Can't Buy Luck (1937)
 The Young Black Stallion (2003)

Z
 Zafir (2003)

Horses